This is a list of yearly Maryland Intercollegiate Football Association standings.

Maryland Intercollegiate Football Association standings

References

Maryland Intercollegiate Football Association
Standings